Coleophora viscidiflorella is a moth of the family Coleophoridae. It is found in the United States, including California.

The larvae feed on the leaves of Chrysothamnus viscidiflorus. They create a trivalved, tubular silken case.

References

viscidiflorella
Moths of North America
Moths described in 1882